Franklin D. Reinhardt and Harren–Hood Farms, also known as the Franklin D. Reinhardt Farm and Alonzo Harren Farm, is a set of two adjoining historic farms and national historic district located near Maiden, Catawba County, North Carolina. The district encompasses 5 contributing buildings and 1 contributing site. The Franklin D. Reinhardt House was built about 1845, and is a two-story, Greek Revival style dwelling nearly identical to the William Pinckney Reinhardt House.  Also on the property is a contributing granary.  The Harren-Hood House was built about 1908, and is a two-story frame, late Victorian farmhouse.  Also on the property is a contributing granary and cattle barn.

It was added to the National Register of Historic Places in 1990.

References

Farms on the National Register of Historic Places in North Carolina
Historic districts on the National Register of Historic Places in North Carolina
Greek Revival houses in North Carolina
Victorian architecture in North Carolina
Houses completed in 1845
Houses in Catawba County, North Carolina
National Register of Historic Places in Catawba County, North Carolina